Grabovo may refer to:

 Grabovo, Croatia, a settlement near Vukovar, Croatia
 Grabovo, Russia, several rural localities in Russia
 Grabovo, Beočin, a village in Vojvodina, Serbia
 Grabovo, Ražanj, a village in Nišava District, Serbia
In Ukraine:

Russian-language versions of places called "Hrabove" in Ukrainian

See also
 The same name may be transliterated differently from different native languages:
 Hrabove (disambiguation)
 Grabovo (disambiguation)
 Grabowo (disambiguation)